Stranded in Arcady is a 1917 American silent adventure film directed by Frank Hall Crane and starring Irene Castle, Elliott Dexter and George Majeroni. It is based on the novel Stranded in the Arcady by Francis Lynde.

Cast
 Irene Castle as Lucy Millington
 Elliott Dexter as Donald Prime
 George Majeroni as Edward Blandish 
 Pell Trenton as Edward Girder

References

Bibliography
 Robert B. Connelly. The Silents: Silent Feature Films, 1910-36, Volume 40, Issue 2. December Press, 1998.

External links
 

1917 films
1917 adventure films
American silent feature films
American adventure films
American black-and-white films
Films directed by Frank Hall Crane
Pathé Exchange films
1910s English-language films
1910s American films
Silent adventure films